Chris Evans is a British artist based in London and a tutor at De Ateliers in Amsterdam. He was the bassist for the now-defunct band Life Without Buildings.

Biography

Evans was born in Eastrington in 1967. He studied graphic design at Leicester De Montford University and completed a Master in Fine Art in 1993 at Winchester School of Art, which was located at their now-defunct annex in Barcelona. Since 2005, and on numerous occasions worldwide, Evans has invited representatives from national police forces to give recruitment presentations at art academies, including at the Pratt Institute, New York (2008), and at the Academy of Fine Arts, Nuremberg (2015). His work is held in various national collections including the Arts Council England, Sculpture International Rotterdam and the Lithuanian Parliament.

Exhibitions

In 2005, Chris Evans participated in the 6th British Art Show and the following year in Eastinternational. Since then, he has exhibited in several international art Biennials: Athens Biennial in 2007, Taipei Biennial in 2010 and Liverpool Biennial in 2014. He has had numerous solo exhibitions, including: Praxes Centre for Contemporary Art, Berlin (2015); Markus Lüttgen, Cologne (2015); Project Arts Centre, Dublin, Ireland (2014); The Gardens, Vilnius (2014); Piper Keys, London (2014); Juliette Jongma (2012); Lüttgenmeijer, Berlin (2011); Marres, Maastricht (2010); British School in Rome (2008); Artpace, San Antonio (2007); STORE, London (2007); Stedelijk Museum Bureau Amsterdam (2006); and Studio Voltaire, London, (2006).

Books

‘Goofy Audit’, published by Sternberg Press, 2011 
‘Collected Filmscripts’, published by Institute of Contemporary Arts, London, 2010 [7]
‘Militant Bourgeois’ Published by Stedelijk Museum Bureau Amsterdam; Black Diamond Press, NY & International Project Space, Birmingham, 2007  [8]
‘Magnetic Promenade (and other sculpture parks)’, published by Studio Voltaire, London, 2006 [9]
‘Radical Loyalty’, Published by City Projects, London; Art Museum of Estonia; Peacock Visual Arts, Aberdeen, 2005

References

External links
Joanna Laws, Chris Evans, frieze, Issue 168, January–February 2015
David Crowley, Liverpool Biennial, frieze, Issue 165, September 2014
Marina Vishmidt, A Heteroclite Excursus into the Currency that Lives, open! *Platform for Art, Culture & the Public Domain, July 4, 2014
Tirdad Zolghadr, Annunciationation: On Chris Evans’ Portrait of a Recipient as a Door Handle, open! Platform for Art, Culture & the Public Domain, July 4, 2014
Natasha Soobramanien,Chris Evans vans/frieze, Issue 152, December 2012
Jonathan Griffin, The Impossible Prison, frieze, Issue 121, March 2009
Dan Kidner, Chris Evans: Socially Awkward, Art & Research, Volume 2. No. 1. Summer 2008
Alex Farquharson, Looking Back: Emerging Artists, frieze, Issue 104, January–February 2007
Andrew Bonacina, Chris Evans: Focus, frieze, Issue 106, April 2007
Interview with Chris Evans at Liverpool Biennial
Chris Evans
Markus Luettgen gallery
Galerie Juliette Jongma

People from the East Riding of Yorkshire
Living people
1967 births
English contemporary artists
Artists from London
Alumni of De Montfort University